The fediverse (a portmanteau of "federation" and "universe") is an ensemble of federated (i.e. interconnected) servers that are used for web publishing (i.e. social networking, microblogging, blogging, or websites) and file hosting, but which, while independently hosted, can communicate with each other. 
On different servers (technically instances), users can create so-called identities. These identities are able to communicate over the boundaries of the instances because the software running on the servers supports one or more communication protocols that follow an open standard. As an identity on the fediverse, users are able to post text and other media, or to follow posts by other identities. In some cases, users can show or share data (video, audio, text, and other files) publicly or to a selected group of identities, and allow other identities to edit other users' data (such as a calendar or an address book).

History 
In 2008, the social network identi.ca was founded by Evan Prodromou. He published the software GNU social under a free license (GNU Affero General Public License, AGPL).  It defined the OStatus protocol. Besides the server, identi.ca, there were few other instances, run by persons for their own use.  This changed in 2011–12 when identi.ca switched to another software called pump.io. Several new GNU social instances were created.  At the same time as GNU social, other projects like Friendica, Hubzilla, Mastodon, and Pleroma integrated the OStatus protocol, thus extending the fediverse (though Mastodon and Pleroma have since dropped OStatus in favor of ActivityPub). In the meantime, other communication protocols evolved which were integrated to different degrees into the software packages.

In January 2018, the W3C presented the ActivityPub protocol, aiming to improve the interoperability between the different software packages run on a wide network of servers. , this protocol was supported by thirteen software packages (see table below), and was the dominant protocol used in the Fediverse.

Communication protocols used in the fediverse 

These communication protocols, which implement open standards, are used in the fediverse:

 ActivityPub
 Diaspora Network
 OStatus
 Zot & Zot/6

Fediverse software packages

The software packages used in the fediverse are FOSS. Some of them vaguely resemble Twitter in style (for example, Mastodon, Misskey, GNU social, and Pleroma, which are similar in their microblogging function), while others include more communication and transaction options that are instead comparable to Google+ or Facebook (such as is the case with Friendica and Hubzilla).

The following software packages span the fediverse by using the listed communication protocols:

User statistics 
A number of developers publish live statistics about the fediverse on monitoring sites like the-federation.info. The statistics on these sites are an indication of usage levels, not a complete record, as they can only aggregate data from instances that use the NodeInfo protocol to publish usage statistics. There is no guarantee that all instances are known to these sites, and some instances may disable NodeInfo, or use software that hasn't implemented it. Some of these sites include data from any federated software that publishes it using NodeInfo, not just fediverse software.

See also
 Comparison of software and protocols for distributed social networking
 IndieWeb

References

Further reading
 2022. Toxicity in the Decentralized Web and the Potential for Model Sharing
 2021. Exploring Content Moderation in the Decentralised Web: The Pleroma Case
 2019. The disinformation landscape and the lockdown of social platforms 
 2019. Challenges in the Decentralised Web: The Mastodon Case
 2018. Recommending Users: Whom to Follow on Federated Social Networks
 2018. Multi-task dialog act and sentiment recognition on Mastodon
 2015. FCJ-190 Building a Better Twitter: A Study of the Twitter Alternatives GNU social, Quitter, rstat.us, and Twister 
 2015. The Case for Alternative Social Media 

 
Microblogging
Free software
Social networks
2008 introductions